Dorothy Lyman is an American television actress, director, and producer. She is most known for her work as Gwen Frame on Another World, on All My Children as Opal Sue Gardner, as Rebecca Whitmore on Generations, and on the sitcom Mama's Family as Naomi Harper.

Life and career

Lyman was born in Minneapolis, Minnesota, to Violet E. (née Brightwell) and Hector H. Lyman, who was a stockbroker. She is Protestant. Jill Larson, who succeeded her in the role of Opal on All My Children, and she attended the same high school. She debuted on her first soap opera, A World Apart, as flower child Julie Stark in 1971. Several years later, Dorothy appeared as Elly Jo Jamison, an evil relation of wealthy Orin Hillyer's, on The Edge of Night.

She played architect Gwen Parrish Frame (1976–1980, 1989) on Another World and played Ralphie's mother in Jean Shepherd's Ollie Hopnoodle's Haven of Bliss from 1988.  She appeared in the Tales from the Darkside television series in the "In the Cards" episode (1985),  in ALF as Maura Norris in the episode "Tequila" (1988), Generations as Rebecca Whitmore (1990–1991), and in The Bold and the Beautiful as Bonnie Roberts (1991–1992).

Her most notable soap opera role, though, has been on All My Children as Opal Sue Gardner, for which she received two Emmy Awards—as Outstanding Actress in a Supporting Role in a Daytime Drama Series in 1982 and for Outstanding Actress in a Daytime Drama Series in 1983.

In an appearance on Vicki Lawrence's talk show Vicki!, Lyman noted that she continued to perform on All My Children concurrently with the beginning of Mama's Family'''s production, flying back and forth each week between New York City and Los Angeles. While the commute was brutal, she remembered it fondly, referring to that stage of her career as "All My Paychecks". When Mama's Family ended its run, Lyman went behind the camera, producing and directing 75 episodes of The Nanny (all episodes of the third and fourth seasons, and all but four episodes of the fifth), even making a special guest appearance on the Fran Drescher sitcom. After Mama's Family ended in 1990, Lyman had a recurring role on Bob, Bob Newhart's third series.

On the big screen, she made a cameo appearance in I Love Trouble, a film starring Nick Nolte and Julia Roberts.  She made another cameo appearance in the 2001 film Blow starring Johnny Depp.  She was seen in the 2006 film The Departed.

In 2007, Lyman guest-starred in the third season of the reimagined Battlestar Galactica as Starbuck's mother. She made a guest appearance on Reba, playing the titular character's mother. She appeared in The Blacklist in the season-six episode "The Pawnbrokers".

Lyman performed My Kitchen Wars'' in Hollywood and New York as a one-woman show based on the book by Betty Fussell.

Personal life
From 1971 to 1983, Lyman was married to director and actor John Tillinger; they have two children, including daughter Emma Tillinger Koskoff, who is an  Academy Awards-nominated producer. Her son, Sebastian Tillinger, is an  actor. From her second marriage to French film producer Vincent Malle, Lyman has a son.

Filmography

Film

Television

References

External links
 
 
 
 

American film actresses
American soap opera actresses
American television actresses
American television directors
American television producers
American women television producers
American women film directors
American women television directors
Living people
Actresses from Minneapolis
Film directors from Minnesota
Daytime Emmy Award winners
Daytime Emmy Award for Outstanding Lead Actress in a Drama Series winners
Daytime Emmy Award for Outstanding Supporting Actress in a Drama Series winners
American women film producers
Film producers from Minnesota
21st-century American women
Year of birth missing (living people)